Lachesana is a genus of spiders in the family Zodariidae. It was first described in 1932 by Strand. , it contains 11 species.

Species
Lachesana comprises 11 species:
 L. bayramgocmeni Özkütük, Yağmur, Gücel, Shafaie, Özden & Kunt, 2020 — Cyprus
 L. blackwalli (O. Pickard-Cambridge, 1872) — Greece, Cyprus, Turkey, Israel, Lebanon
 L. dyachkovi Fomichev & Marusik, 2019 — Kazakhstan
 L. graeca Thaler & Knoflach, 2004 — Greece
 L. insensibilis Jocqué, 1991 — Israel, Saudi Arabia, Iran
 L. kavirensis Zamani & Marusik, 2021 — Iran
 L. naxos Wunderlich, 2022 — Greece
 L. perseus Zamani & Marusik, 2021 — Iran
 L. perversa (Audouin, 1826) (type) — Egypt, Syria
 L. rufiventris (Simon, 1873) — Israel, Syria
 L. tarabaevi Zonstein & Ovtchinnikov, 1999 — Kyrgyzstan, Uzbekistan, Tajikistan

References

Zodariidae
Araneomorphae genera
Spiders of Asia
Spiders of Africa